The 2001 soundtrack Spaced: Soundtrack to the TV Series accompanied the first series of the Channel 4 situation comedy Spaced. The soundtrack was jointly released on DVD and VHS with the first series. However, it wasn't followed up by a second soundtrack series release. 

The Guy Pratt mashup of Camisra's "Let Me Show You" and the A-Team theme music was never made commercially available.

Track listing
 "Warm Up Music" (0:08)
 "Theme Of Luxury" - Fantastic Plastic Machine (1:05)
 "Count Five Or Six" - Cornelius (3:03)
 "Beat Goes On" - All Seeing I (4:00)
 "We're A Couple" - "John Shakespeare - Sandals In The Sand" (0:04)
 "Gritty Shaker" - David Holmes (6:10)
 "Smash It" - Fuzz Townshend (4:17)
 "There Must Be An Angel" - Fantastic Plastic Machine (3:58)
 "It's Over" (0:05)
 "Homespin Rerun (Kid Loco Space Raid Remix) - High Llamas (7:47)
 "We're Gonna Get Our Dog Back" - (generic military snare drum march) (0:05)
 "Absurd (Whitewash Edit)" - Fluke (3:39)
 "More Beats And Pieces" - Coldcut (4:03)
 "Morse" - Nightmares On Wax (6:20)
 "If We Have It They Will Come" (0:04)
 "Bobby Dazzler" - Sons Of Silence (4:53)
 "Delta Sun Bottleneck Stomp (Chemical Brothers Remix)" - Mercury Rev (6:22)
 "Disco Fudge" (0:13)
 "Synth And Strings" - Yomanda (3:18)
 "Test Card" - Fuzz Townshend (3:30)
 "This Party Is Rubbish" (0:04)
 "King Of Rock And Roll" - Prefab Sprout (4:23)
 "S'Il Vous Plait - Fantastic Plastic Machine (5:39)
 "Fake Sex Noises" (0:08)

External links
Spaced-Out track listings

Spaced
Television soundtracks
2001 soundtrack albums